Pedioplanis haackei is a species of lizard in the family Lacertidae. The species is endemic to Angola.

Etymology
The specific name, haackei, is in honor of South African herpetologist Wulf Dietrich Haacke (born 1936).

Geographic range
P. haackei is found in Namibe Province in southwestern Angola.

Habitat
The natural habitat of P. haackei is sandy plains near rock outcrops with some grass and Senegalia mellifera thorn bushes.

Description
P. haackei has 10 longitudinal rows of ventral scales. It typically has three faint dorso-lateral stripes, which are dark-colored and bordered with white. The flanks have a reticulated pattern. The semitransparent "window" of the lower eyelid consists of two large scales.

References

Further reading
Conradie W, Measey GJ, Branch WR, Tolley KA (2012). "Revised phylogeny of African sand lizards (Pedioplanis), with the description of two new species from south-western Angola". African Journal of Herpetology 61 (2): 91–112. (Pedioplanis haackei, new species).

Pedioplanis
Lacertid lizards of Africa
Reptiles of Angola
Endemic fauna of Angola
Reptiles described in 2012
Taxa named by Werner Conradie
Taxa named by G. John Measey
Taxa named by William Roy Branch
Taxa named by Krystal A. Tolley